Jon Thum is a visual effects artist. He contributed work on The Matrix and The Chronicles of Narnia: Prince Caspian.  As a supervisor at Prime Focus World in 2012, he led a 70-person team of artists to produce 650 visual effects shots for Dredd 3D.

Oscars
Both of these are in the category of Best Visual Effects

72nd Academy Awards-The Matrix, shared with Steve Courtley, John Gaeta and Janek Sirrs. Won.
79th Academy Awards-Nominated for Superman Returns. Nomination shared with Mark Stetson, Neil Corbould and Richard R. Hoover. Lost to Pirates of the Caribbean: Dead Man's Chest.

Selected filmography

Dredd (2012)
G.I. Joe: The Rise of Cobra (2009)
The Chronicles of Narnia: Prince Caspian (2008)
Quantum of Solace (2008)
Superman Returns (2006)
Charlie and the Chocolate Factory (2005)
Troy (2004)
The Matrix Reloaded (2003)
Harry Potter and the Chamber of Secrets (2002)
What Lies Beneath (2000)
The Matrix (1999)

References

External links

Living people
Best Visual Effects Academy Award winners
Best Visual Effects BAFTA Award winners
Special effects people
Year of birth missing (living people)